YSR Indoor Stadium (French: Stade couvert YSR) is an indoor sporting arena located in Yanam, which is part of Union Territory of Pondichery .  The capacity of the arena is 2,000 people.  It hosted some events for the Indian Volley League in 2011.

The stadium is owned and maintained by Yanam Sports and Games Development Authority. It has facilities for hosting indoor game including volleyball, badminton, and basketball. The stadium is fully air-air-conditioned and has all the modern facilities of hosting indoor games. The stadium has hosted Junior National Badminton Championships, South Zone basketball championships, and a few volleyball and basketball matches.

The stadium came into the national picture in 2011 when the Indian Volley League's third leg matches were held, and it also became the home of the Yanam Tigers.

Indian Volley League matches

2011 Indian Volley League 

This is a list of Indian Volley League matches hosted in Yanam. 

|}

External links 

 Yanam Government
 Volleyball Federation of India

References

Yanam
Indoor arenas in India
Volleyball venues in India
Sports venues in Yanam 
Sports venues completed in 2010
2010 establishments in Puducherry